The R2 Marine Dr is an express bus service with bus rapid transit elements in Metro Vancouver, British Columbia, Canada. Part of TransLink's RapidBus network, it travels along Marine Drive, 3rd Street, Cotton Road, and Main Street in North Vancouver and connects major North Shore transit points Park Royal Exchange, Lonsdale Quay, and Phibbs Exchange.

The route started service on April 6, 2020. It is operated by Coast Mountain Bus Company and funded by TransLink.

All articulated buses used on this route are hybrid and air-conditioned. Although articulated buses are mainly assigned, standard buses may be assigned instead.

History
According to phase one of the Mayors' Council 10-Year Vision, the plan was to have the route operate as a B-Line between Dundarave in West Vancouver and Phibbs Exchange via Park Royal. In March 2019, after opposition from West Vancouver residents, the city of West Vancouver decided that the western terminus of the route would be at Park Royal instead of Dundarave.

In July 2019, the proposed new B-Line routes in phase one of the Mayors’ Council 10-Year Vision were re-branded to RapidBus.

Construction delays became prevalent in September 2019. As a result, the service did not make its debut in January 2020 along with the other RapidBus routes. Instead, the route started service in the second quarter of 2020.

The service began operations on April 6, 2020, as part of TransLink's Spring 2020 service changes. The route replaced route 239 between Phibbs Exchange and Park Royal, with local service being maintained through the use of other routes.

Route description

Departing from Phibbs Exchange, the R2 RapidBus travels west along Main Street towards 3rd Street, Lonsdale Avenue and into Lonsdale Quay. It then returns to 3rd Street and continues west to Park Royal Exchange along Marine Drive.

Stops
 Phibbs Exchange – A major transfer point for other routes serving North Vancouver, Vancouver, and Burnaby
 Brooksbank Avenue
 Ridgeway Avenue
 3rd Street–Lonsdale Avenue
 Lonsdale Quay – connects to bus routes serving North Vancouver and the SeaBus ferry service into Downtown Vancouver and serves the Lonsdale Quay public market
 Bewicke Avenue
 Hamilton Avenue
 Pemberton Avenue
 Capilano Road
 Park Royal Exchange – serves Park Royal Shopping Centre and is a major transfer point for other local and express bus services to Downtown Vancouver, West Vancouver, and Horseshoe Bay

See also
97 B-Line
98 B-Line
99 B-Line
R1 King George Blvd
R3 Lougheed Hwy
R4 41st Ave
R5 Hastings St
List of bus routes in Metro Vancouver

References

External links

 TransLink
 Timetable
 Route diagram

RapidBus (TransLink)
Transport in North Vancouver (city)
Transport in North Vancouver (district municipality)
Transport in West Vancouver
2020 establishments in British Columbia